Metin Ataseven (born 1972) is a Swedish politician, representing the Moderate Party in the Swedish Riksdag. Ataseven was substitute for Mikael Sandström (2010–12) and for Ewa Björling (2012–13). From 1 January 2013 to October 2014, he was an ordinary member.

References

1972 births
Members of the Riksdag from the Moderate Party
Living people
Members of the Riksdag 2010–2014